This is a list of all the members of the British Ice Hockey Hall of Fame.

A
Paul Adey (2006)
J. F. "Bunny" Ahearne (1986)
Les Anning (1999)
Alex Archer (1993)

B
Vic Batchelder (2000)
Lou Bates (1950)
George Beach (1989)
Joe Beaton (1950)
Mike Blaisdell (2004)
Bill Booth (1989)
Jimmy Borland (1993)
Rick Brebant (2004)
Edgar "Chirp" Brenchley (1993)
Alastair Brennan (1990)
Billy Brennan (2004)

C
Keith "Duke" Campbell (1948)
Earl Carlson (1998)
Johnny Carlyle (1988)
Jimmy Chappell (1993)
Arthur Child (1993)
Willie Clark (1993)
David Clarke (2019)
Joanne Collins (2008)
Kevin Conway (2005)
Ian Cooper (2002)
Stephen Cooper (2003)
Johnny Coward (1993)
Tim Cranston (2010)
Micky Curry (1994)

D
Gordon Dailley (1993)
Norman de Mesquita (2002)
Alex Dampier (1995)
Gerry Davey (1949)
Frank Dempster (1992)
Ernie Domenico (2022)
Phil Drackett (2007)
Jack Dryburgh (1991)

E
Sir Arther Elvin MBE (1990)
Carl Erhardt (1950)

F
Ian Forbes (2009) 
Jimmy Foster (1950)

G
R. G. "Bobby" Giddens (1986)
Jim Gillespie (2013)
Bill Glennie (1951)
Alec Goldstone (1992)

H
Roy Halpin (1986)
Tony Hand (2016)
Moray Hanson (2013)
Martin C Harris (2022)
Art Hodgins (1989)
Shannon Hope (1999)
Charlie Huddlestone (2018)
Gib Hutchinson (1951)

I
Thomas "Red" Imrie (1987)

J
Peter "Jonker" Johnson (1989)

K
Chris Kelland (2002)
T. M. "Doc" Kellough (1950)
Willie Kerr Snr. (1990)
Keith Kewley (2005)
Marshall Key (2007)
Jack Kilpatrick (1993)
Charlie Knott Jr. (2004)

L
Gordon Latto (1999)
Tommy Lauder (1951)
John Lawless (1997)
Ernie Leacock (1987)
Benny Lee (1995)
Bobby Lee (1949)
David Longstaff (2022)
Lawrence Lovell (1992)
Les Lovell (2011)
Stevie Lyle (2018)
Jim Lynch (2001)

M
Neal Martin (2011)
Pat Marsh (1988)
Terry Matthews (1987)
Freddie Meredith (2003)
Jackson McBride (2008)
Joe McIntosh (2012)
George McNeil (1956)
Alfie Miller (1989)
Wally "Pop" Monson (1955)
Steve Moria (2016)
John Murray (1996)

N
Scott Neil (2007)
Percy Nicklin (1988)

O
Mike O'Brien (2009)
Johnny Oxley (2008)

P
B. M. "Peter" Patton (1950)
Annette and Allan Petrie (2005)
Bert Peer (1955)
Gordon Poirier (1948)

R
Derek Reilly (1987)
Glen Reilly (2009)
Stewart Roberts (2013)
Clarence "Sonny" Rost (1955)
John Rost (1991)
Hilton Ruggles (2009)

S
Blane Sexton (1950)
Roy Shepherd (1999) 
Colin Shields (2021)
Ron Shudra (2010)
J. J. "Icy" Smith (1988)
Bill Sneddon (2010)
Floyd Snider (1951)
Jimmy Spence (2006)
Harvey "Red" Stapleford (1986)
Gary Stefan (2000) 
Rob Stewart (2012)
Robert Stevenson (2011)
Sam Stevenson (1986)
Archie Stinchcombe (1951)
Les Strongman (1987)
James "Tiny" Syme (2006)
Thomas "Tuck" Syme (2005)
Ken Swinburne (2006)

T
Glynne Thomas (1991)
Hep Tindale (2019)
Nico Toeman (1993)

U
Mike Urquhart (2007)

W
 Gordon Wade (2021)
Alan Weeks (1988)
Jack Wharry (1994)
Dave Whistle (2013)
Rob Wilson (2011)
Ian Wight (1993)
William Pollock Wylie (2010)
Bob Wyman (1993)

Z
Victor "Chick" Zamick (1951)

References

External links
British Ice Hockey Hall of Fame official website

 
British Ice Hockey Hall of Fame